The International Tennis Federation (ITF) designates a World Champion each year based on performances throughout the year, emphasising the Grand Slam tournaments, and also considering team events such as the Davis Cup and Fed Cup. Men's and women's singles champions were first named in 1978; the title is now also awarded for doubles, wheelchair, and junior players. It is sometimes named the "ITF Player of the Year" award, alluding to similar other year-end awards in tennis.

Rules and procedures
The ITF's constitution states that no tennis tournament can be designated the "World Championships" without unanimous consent of the ITF Council. There is currently no such tournament. The constitution also states:
The ITF may award the title of World Champion to players who, in the opinion of the Board of Directors, are the most outstanding players in any one-year. The names of players who have been awarded this title shall be listed in the Roll of Honour.
It also states:
Official Tennis Championships [i.e. the Grand Slam events] shall be the decisive factor in the determination of the ITF World Champions for each year.

For singles, ITF appoints a panel of former top players at the start of the season, which votes on the champion at the end of the season.

The boys' and girls' singles and doubles titles prior to 2003 were awarded based on world ranking. Since then singles and doubles rankings have been combined in a single award each for boys and for girls.

The world champion accolade has been extended by the ITF to wheelchair tennis players of the Men's and Women's division since 1991. In November 2017, the ITF announced that the quad wheelchair tennis division is to be recognised in its annual list of ITF World Champions.

In 1996, the Philippe Chatrier Award was introduced, honouring individuals or organisations who have made outstanding contributions to tennis globally, both on and off the court. The award is considered to be the ITF's highest accolade and is named after the former French tennis player Philippe Chatrier, who was President of the governing body between 1977 and 1991.

The ITF World Champions' Dinner takes place in Paris during the French Open, to honour the previous year's champions, who are presented with a trophy, but not any monetary prize.

For 2020 there were no ITF World Champion awards given due to the COVID-19 pandemic. The tennis season was suspended for about 5 months for both the female and the male tennis players.

Men's singles
The first men's panel in 1978 had three members, Don Budge, Fred Perry, and Lew Hoad, who attended the season's Grand Slam events at ITF expense to inform their choice. The 1983 panel split two to one between John McEnroe (votes of Budge and Perry) and Mats Wilander (vote of Hoad). The 1984 panel had five members, while the 1985 panel had four: Budge, Perry, Hoad, and Tony Trabert. When Ivan Lendl was chosen as champion for 1985, the panel's announcement was accompanied with a rebuke for Lendl's criticism of some tournaments and his refusal to play in the Davis Cup. Perry and Trabert were on the 1986 panel, with performances outside the Grand Slams taken into consideration.

The 1990 designation of Lendl as champion was a surprise.  That year, the Association of Tennis Professionals named Stefan Edberg its "Player of The Year", in accordance with the ATP rankings, while Tennis Magazine (France) ranked Edberg first, Andre Agassi second, and Lendl third. Tennis also suggested the ITF was punishing Edberg for denigrating the Grand Slam Cup tournament it had introduced. The ITF panel, of Perry, Trabert, and Frank Sedgman, called it "the toughest decision any of us can remember having to make", and stated it was Lendl's better average performance in the Grand Slams that made the difference.

The choice to award Djokovic the ITF World Champion of 2013 over Nadal was unexpected. Nadal finished the year ranked #1 and with more Grand Slams (2 to 1), more Masters titles (5 to 3), and more tournament titles (10 to 7).  Similar to the situation with Edberg in 1990, the ITF cited Nadal's failure to win a match at 2 of the 4 Grand Slams (DNP the Australian Open, 1st round loss at Wimbledon) to justify their decision and Djokovic's consistent results across all four Grand Slams (1 title, 2 runner-ups, 1 SF), Davis Cup (led Serbia to final, won 7/7 singles rubbers) and the ATP World Tour Finals (won title).

Other instances when the ITF choices differed from the ATP rankings are 1978 (Jimmy Connors), 1982 (McEnroe), 1989 (Lendl), and 2022 (Carlos Alcaraz).   None of these, however, were controversial and were generally agreed upon, with the 1978 and 1982 choices being particularly clear cut in favor of Borg (1978) and Connors (1982). Nadal was the ITF World Champion in 2022 even though Carlos Alcaraz was the year-end number 1 due to Nadal, who was the year-end number 2, winning two Grand Slam titles and Alcaraz not reaching a semifinal or final in three out of the four Grand Slams.

Women's singles
The women's panel initially featured three former women's champions, Margaret Court, Margaret duPont and Ann Jones. Althea Gibson was a member through the early 1980s.

ITF world champions for women differed from the WTA year-end rankings the following years: 1978 (Martina Navratilova), 1994 (Steffi Graf), 2001 (Lindsay Davenport), 2004 (Lindsay Davenport), 2005 (Lindsay Davenport), 2011 (Caroline Wozniacki), 2012 (Victoria Azarenka), 2017 (Simona Halep).

Doubles

Junior

Singles (1978–2003)

Doubles (1978–2003)

Wheelchair

Quad's wheelchair

See also
World number 1 ranked male tennis players
World number 1 ranked female tennis players
International Tennis Federation
Philippe Chatrier Award
ATP Awards
WTA Awards
Tennis statistics

References
ITF Constitution

Footnotes

External links
 

 
History of tennis
Tennis awards
Lists of tennis players
Tennis records and statistics
International Tennis Federation
ITF
World number 1 ranked tennis players